The 2015 TCR International Series Shanghai round was the second round of the 2015 TCR International Series season. It took place on 11–12 April at the Shanghai International Circuit.

Gianni Morbidelli won the first race, starting from pole position, driving a Honda Civic Type R TCR (FK2), and Andrea Belicchi gained the second one, driving a SEAT León Cup Racer.

Success Ballast
Due to the results obtained in the previous round, Stefano Comini received +30 kg, Pepe Oriola +20 kg and Jordi Gené +10 kg.

Classification

Qualifying

Race 1

Notes:
 — Mikhail Grachev was given a 30-second penalty for causing a collision with Jordi Gené.

Race 2

Notes:
 — René Münnich was given a 30-second penalty for causing a collision with Sergey Afanasyev.

Standings after the event

Drivers' Championship standings

Teams' Championship standings

 Note: Only the top five positions are included for both sets of drivers' standings.

References

External links
TCR International Series official website

Shanghai
TCR International Series, Shanghai